Anona may refer to:

 Anona, Ecuador
 "Anona" (song), a popular song written by Vivian Grey
 Anona Winn, Australian-born actress, broadcaster and singer
 Degree of Anona, a youth group attached to the Degree of Pocahontas

See also

 Annona (disambiguation)
Antona (disambiguation)